Paulino Díaz (12 January 1935 – 26 June 2006) was a Mexican sports shooter. He competed in the 50 metre rifle, prone event at the 1960 Summer Olympics.

References

1935 births
2006 deaths
Mexican male sport shooters
Olympic shooters of Mexico
Shooters at the 1960 Summer Olympics
Sportspeople from Guadalajara, Jalisco
Pan American Games medalists in shooting
Pan American Games silver medalists for Mexico
Pan American Games bronze medalists for Mexico
Shooters at the 1963 Pan American Games
20th-century Mexican people
21st-century Mexican people